Aarøsund is a village in south-eastern Denmark situated in the region of Sønderjylland 15 kilometres east of Haderslev. It is also the name of the narrow strait between the village and the island of Årø. It has a population of 321 (1 January 2022) and is part of the municipality of Haderslev and the regional entity Region of Southern Denmark, as well as the parish of Øsby.

In spite of its slight size, Aarøsund has a significant part in Danish history. Archaeological surveys have shown the area to have been inhabited since the Iron Age with the occurrence of an abundance of flint tools suggesting an even earlier settlement here.

In 1231 King Valdemar's cadaster mentions the King's sovereignty of the ferry route between Aarøsund and Assens on the island of Fyn. In 1640 the Royal Danish mail services decided on the Assens-Aarøsund ferry service - instead of the ferry service connecting Middelfart and Snoghøj - to be part of the most important, Danish postal route of its day, København-Hamburg.

The ferry estate, situated close to the water front, has provided shelter for many a famous person waiting for a safe fare to Fyn, not least many Danish Kings. Hans Christian Andersen, the world-famous writer of fairy tales, noted his stays in Aarøsund in his travel diaries.

At the end of the 16th century the Danish King, Christian IV, planned construction of a ship in Haderslev, but with the fjord being sanded up, he instead chose Aarøsund as the site of construction.

The landmark of the village is the lighthouse, seen here on the right. The current lighthouse was constructed during the German occupation of Sønderjylland 1864-1920, but the first lighthouse was set up as early as 1777.

Traditionally the village attracted scores of tourists in the summer, Danish and foreign alike (in particular German), due to its charming fishing village atmosphere, but numerous reconstructions of the harbour has left the waterfront less attractive than before. It is still, however, considered a prime site for fishing among anglers.

A couple of kilometres south of the village itself Denmark's largest camping ground, Gammelbro camping, has room for around 900 guests. Aarøsund Badehotel is another, more luxurious option for an overnight stay. It was built in 1903, and underwent extensive renovation during the 1990s, meaning it appears virtually newly built. Scores of summer houses close to the beach and a newly established bed and breakfast offer yet more options.

A marina was constructed just north of the old harbour in 1988 and has a capacity of 151 boats. In conjunction with the marina an old train engine shed houses Aarøsund Bådebyggeri, a small ship yard that vows to good workmanship. The area is also home to a community center and a fishing restaurant.

Midway between the old harbour and the camping ground an old German bunker, constructed around the time of World War I, appears on the beach. During World War I, it formed part of "Sicherungsstellung Nord", a German line of 900 bunkers spanning the region of Sønderjylland, constructed to halt an eventual English invasion via the coast of Jutland. In the local dialect, Sønderjysk, the bunker is called "Æ Unnestan".

References

External links
Official site of the village
Official site of the local history society in Aarøsund

Villages in Denmark